In mathematics, the Hardy–Ramanujan theorem, proved by , states  that the normal order of the number ω(n) of distinct prime factors of a number n is log(log(n)).

Roughly speaking, this means that most numbers have about this number of distinct prime factors.

Precise statement
A more precise version states that for every real-valued function ψ(n) that tends to infinity as n tends to infinity

or more traditionally
 
for almost all (all but an infinitesimal proportion of) integers.  That is, let g(x) be the number of positive integers n less than x for which the above inequality fails: then g(x)/x converges to zero as x goes to infinity.

History
A simple proof to the result  was given by Pál Turán, who used the Turán sieve to prove that

Generalizations
The same results are true of Ω(n), the number of prime factors of n counted with multiplicity.
This theorem is generalized by the Erdős–Kac theorem, which shows that ω(n) is essentially normally distributed.

References

 
 

Theorems in analytic number theory
Theorems about prime numbers